Kevin Sinclair may refer to:
 Kevin Sinclair (journalist)
 Kevin Sinclair (cricketer)